Ulimaroa was a name given to Australia by the Swedish geographer and cartographer Daniel Djurberg in 1776.

Origins
Djurberg adapted the name from Olhemaroa, a Māori word (this is disputed, as the Māori language does not use the letter ‘L’) found in Hawkesworth's edition of Captain James Cook and Sir Joseph Banks' journals which is thought to have been a misunderstood translation  the Māori were actually referring to Grand Terre, the largest island of New Caledonia or some Fijian island, and a name actually transcribed as 'Rimaora'. 

Jurberg was convinced that Ulimaroa was a New Zealand Māori name for Australia because when James Cook was on the North Island's north coast, he asked the Maoris if they had knowledge of any other countries. They answered that to the northwest of their nation, a large land was located, which they called 'Ulimaroa'. Recent studies suggests that Djurberg was wrong about the Māori referring Ulimaroa to Australia, and also that name is a misnomer, and it mostly likely did not mean "big red land".

Meaning
Djurberg believed the name meant something like "big red land", whereas modern linguists believe it meant "long hand"  echoing the geography of Grand Terre. 

However, in Oceanic Migration: Paths, Sequence, Timing and Range of Prehistoric Migration in the Pacific and Indian Oceans (2010), Charles E.M. Pearce and F. M. Pearce claimed that Ulimaroa may well have been Australia: maroa means "large" and "parched", and can also mean "dark skinned", while uli means "tribe," making it an appropriate description, and that Maori from New Zealand were unlikely to view Grand Terre as a large island.

Usage
Ulimaroa was initially used by Swedish cartographer Daniel Djurberg in 1776, where he wrote:

The world is divided into 5 main parts: 1. Europe, 2. Asia, 3. Africa, which makes up one large island, 4. America, which makes up the other island, 5. Polynesia, which includes all the large and small islands which cannot be joined to any of the previous four continents and includes, among others, the large island Ulimaroa, which in old geographies is known as New Holland.

Despite its misplaced origin, the spurious name continued to be reproduced on certain European maps, particularly some Austrian, Czech, German and Swedish maps, until around 1820, including in Carl Almqvist's 1817 novel Parjumouf Saga ifrån Nya Holland (Stockholm, 1817).

Cartography
 
The name is featured in the 1795 map titled, Karte von der Inselwelt Polynesien oder dem fünften Welttheile: nach Djurberg und Roberts (Map of the islands of Polynesia or the fifth part of the world: after Djurberg and Roberts) and as well as an 1805 map of Polynesia in the university collections by cartographer Franz Swoboda. 

The 1795 map, which includes the name Ulimaroa, traces the journey paths and directions of several European explorers, such as Ferdinand Magellan, Pedro Fernandes de Queirós, James Cook and Abel Tasman. The map also exhibits inaccuracies, that includes Tasmania being attached to the mainland Australia, and Papua New Guinea being fragmented in two. The map probably originated from Franz Johann Joseph von Reilly's 1794-1796 Grosser deutscher Atlas (Great German Atlas).

See also
Name of Australia
Aotearoa
Terra Australis
New Holland (Australia)

References

Country name etymology
European exploration of Australia
Māori words and phrases